John Martin (born 1958 or 1959) is a Canadian politician and a professor of criminology, who was elected to the Legislative Assembly of British Columbia in the 2013 provincial election.  He represented the electoral district of Chilliwack as a member of the British Columbia Liberal Party.

Academia
Martin is an associate professor at the School of Criminology and Criminal Justice, teaching courses at the University of the Fraser Valley (formerly called UCFV until 2008), and a research associate at the UFV Centre for Criminal Justice Research.  In addition to his work at the UFV-Chilliwack campus, Martin also taught criminal justice classes at Douglas College, Native Education Centre, Lethbridge College, Pacific Regional Training Centre (for RCMP members), and the Staff College of the Correctional Service of Canada, as well as a Canadian Studies class at Takushoku University in Japan.

Martin received a B.A. and then an M.A. from Simon Fraser University, both in criminology, and also received a diploma in Criminal Justice from UCFV.

Politics
Martin announced on December 5, 2011 that he would seek the British Columbia Conservative party nomination in the Chilliwack-Hope by-election.  He became the Tory nominee (was acclaimed as the British Columbia Conservative Party candidate) in 2012, and also was named a member of the minority party shadow cabinet as a counterpart to the then-Liberal-party-member Attorney General of British Columbia.  Martin was first elected, as a member of the British Columbia Liberal Party, during the May 2013 provincial election.  From 2017-2020, Martin represented the Chilliwack district as a member of the Legislative Assembly of British Columbia in Victoria.

Martin has written columns for The Vancouver Province, The Chilliwack Times, and The Abbotsford Times; he received a Certificate of Technology in Broadcast Communications from the British Columbia Institute of Technology.

Electoral record

Personal life
Raised in Canada (lower mainland), married (wife Margaret), and a Chilliwack resident (member of the local Royal Canadian Legion).

Notes

References

External links
 Official page 
 Faculty page

British Columbia Liberal Party MLAs
Living people
21st-century Canadian politicians
Year of birth uncertain
Year of birth missing (living people)